Colostethus latinasus is a species of frog in the family Dendrobatidae. It is known from Cerro Pirre in Darién Province, Panama, from Chocó Department in adjacent Colombia, and from Tierralta, Córdoba Department, Colombia.

Description
The dorsal surfaces are brown; there is a pair of lighter dorsolateral stripes that run from the head to the groin. The throat is white mottled with brown. The belly is mostly pale white but the mottling from the throat may extend onto in. The sides have a broad black stripe. The feet are almost totally without webbing.

The tadpoles are brown and have some darker brown markings on the tail.

Habitat and conservation
In Colombia it occurs in humid montane forests at elevations of about  asl. It is a diurnal species often found along rocky sections of forest streams, but also further away from streams than other Colostethus species.

It occurs in the Darién National Park.

References

latinasus
Amphibians of Colombia
Amphibians of Panama
Amphibians described in 1863
Taxa named by Edward Drinker Cope
Taxonomy articles created by Polbot